In operator algebras, the Toeplitz algebra is the C*-algebra generated by the unilateral shift on the Hilbert space l2(N). Taking l2(N) to be the Hardy space H2, the Toeplitz algebra consists of elements of the form

where Tf is a Toeplitz operator with continuous symbol and K is a compact operator. 

Toeplitz operators with continuous symbols commute modulo the compact operators. So the Toeplitz algebra  can be viewed as the C*-algebra extension of continuous functions on the circle by the compact operators. This extension is called the Toeplitz extension. 

By Atkinson's theorem, an element of the Toeplitz algebra Tf + K is a Fredholm operator if and only if the symbol f of Tf is invertible. In that case, the Fredholm index of Tf + K is precisely the winding number of f, the equivalence class of f in the fundamental group of the circle. This is a special case of the Atiyah-Singer index theorem.

Wold decomposition characterizes proper isometries acting on a Hilbert space. From this, together with properties of Toeplitz operators, one can conclude that the Toeplitz algebra is the universal C*-algebra generated by a proper isometry; this is Coburn's theorem.

References 

C*-algebras